SJ Returns is a Korean reality show of Super Junior that showcases their lives and show the charms of each member, that aired on Naver TV and V Live. The show was first aired in 2017.

Plot
This show will follow Super Junior's everyday life. In season 1 the show showcased their comeback story for their 8th album after 2 years of hiatus as a group. The show was put on an end after the release of their comeback album. Season 1 was aired from October 9, 2017 to November 24, 2017, every Monday to Friday at 11:00 AM KST and on JTBC2 from December 6, 2017 at 9:00 p.m. KST.

On 26 October 2018, Label SJ announced that the show would be back with Season 2. During the second season of the show, the group had a totally different theme from the last season and showed refreshing new charms of the members where they show the best food around Tokyo. Season 2 was released on November 5 to December 26, 2018.

In 2019 Label SJ announced that they would be launching “SJ Returns 3,” which followed the members on their individual activities, as well as their preparations for their new album that will be released on the same year. At noon KST on August 26, Super Junior released an introductory video to “SJ Returns 3” and explained, “Super Junior’s individual hiatuses due to the army, which lasted 10 years in total, are finally over. Please tune in to see the nine members of Super Junior who are back from the army prepare for our ninth album.”  Season 3 aired on September 9 to October 20, 2019.

In 2020, Super Junior's Yesung and Donghae posted a picture which stated that the group is filming SJ Returns Season 4 and that it would air soon. Leeteuk also stated on the same day on his YouTube live stream that SJ Returns Season 4 will be back and planned to air in May, The teaser for Season 4 was aired on April 27, 2020, and its first episode was released on May 2, 2020. In their second teaser, the members tell the concept for SJ Returns 4 will be ‘for ELF’, where the show will fulfill the requests from fans. They also mentioned that this season will be a lengthy program.

Cast 
The show's cast is made up of Super Junior members.

List of Episodes

Season 1

Season 2

Season 3

Season 4

References

External links

Super Junior television series
Television series by SM C&C